Kevin Joseph Aloysius "Chuck" Connors (April 10, 1921 – November 10, 1992) was an American actor, writer, and professional basketball and baseball player. He is one of only 13 athletes in the history of American professional sports to have played in both Major League Baseball (Brooklyn Dodgers 1949, Chicago Cubs, 1951) and the National Basketball Association (Boston Celtics 1946–48). With a 40-year film and television career, he is best known for his five-year role as Lucas McCain in the highly rated ABC series The Rifleman (1958–63).

Early life and education 

Connors was born on April 10, 1921, in Brooklyn, New York City, the elder of two children born to Marcella and Alban Francis "Allan" Connors, immigrants of Irish descent from Newfoundland and Labrador. He had one sibling, a sister, Gloria, who was two years his junior.

His father became a citizen of the United States in 1914 and was working in Brooklyn in 1930 as a longshoreman and his mother had also attained her U.S. citizenship in 1917. Raised as a Catholic, he served as an altar boy at the Basilica of Our Lady of Perpetual Help in Brooklyn.

Connors was a devoted fan of the Brooklyn Dodgers despite their losing record during the 1930s, and he hoped to join the team one day. A talented athlete, he earned a scholarship to the Adelphi Academy, a preparatory school in Brooklyn, where he graduated in 1939. He received offers for athletic scholarships from more than two dozen colleges and universities.

From those offers, he chose to attend Seton Hall University in South Orange, New Jersey. There, he played both basketball and baseball for the school, and it was there, too, where he changed his name. Since childhood, Connors had disliked his first name, Kevin, and he had sought another name. He tried using "Lefty" and "Stretch" before finally settling on "Chuck". The name derived from his time as a player on Seton Hall's baseball team. He would repeatedly yell to the pitcher from his position on first base, "Chuck it to me, baby! Chuck it to me!" The rest of his teammates and spectators at the university's games soon caught on, and the nickname stuck.

Connors left Seton Hall after two years to accept a contract to play professional baseball. He played on two minor league teams (see below) in 1940 and 1942, then joined the United States Army following America's entrance into World War II. During most of the war, he served as a tank-warfare instructor at Fort Campbell, Kentucky, and later at West Point in New York.

Sports career

Minor League Baseball (1940–1942) 
In 1940, following his departure from college, Connors played four baseball games with the Brooklyn Dodgers' minor league team, the Newport Dodgers (Northeast Arkansas League). Released, he sat out the 1941 season, then signed with the New York Yankees farm team, the Norfolk Tars (Piedmont League), where he played 72 games before enlisting in the Army at Fort Knox, Kentucky, at the end of the season, on October 10, 1942.

Professional basketball (1946–1948)
Following his military discharge in 1946, the  Connors joined the Rochester Royals (now the Sacramento Kings) of the National Basketball League for their 1945-1946 championship season.  For the 1946-1947 season he joined the newly formed Boston Celtics of the Basketball Association of America. During his tenure with Celtics in 1946, Connors became the first professional basketball player to break a backboard. He did so during pre-game practice before the Celtics' first home game of their inaugural season with a shot and not a slam dunk, which is what typically breaks a backboard in modern basketball. He played 53 games for Boston before leaving the team early in the 1947–48 season.

Connors is one of 13 athletes to have played in both the National Basketball Association and Major League Baseball. The twelve others to have played are: Danny Ainge,  Frank Baumholtz, Hank Biasatti, Gene Conley, Dave DeBusschere, Dick Groat, Steve Hamilton, Mark Hendrickson, Cotton Nash, Ron Reed, Dick Ricketts, and Howie Schultz.

Connors attended spring training in 1948 with Major League Baseball's Brooklyn Dodgers but did not make the squad He played two seasons for the Dodgers' AAA team, the Montreal Royals before playing one game with the Dodgers in 1949. After two more seasons with Montreal, Connors joined the Chicago Cubs in 1951, playing in 66 games as a first baseman and occasional pinch hitter. In 1952, he was sent to the minor leagues again to play for the Cubs' top farm team, the Los Angeles Angels.

Sports career notes
In 1966, Connors played an off-field role by helping to end the celebrated holdout (see reserve clause) by Los Angeles Dodgers pitchers Don Drysdale and Sandy Koufax when he acted as an intermediary during negotiations between management and the players. Connors can be seen in the Associated Press photo with Drysdale, Koufax and Dodgers general manager Buzzie Bavasi announcing the pitchers' new contracts.

Connors was the first professional basketball player to be credited with shattering a backboard when he brought down an improperly installed glass backboard with a 40-foot heave as warmups ended before the season opener was to start at the Boston Arena on November 5, 1946.

Contrary to erroneous reports, Connors was not drafted by the Chicago Bears of the NFL.

Career statistics

BAA

Source

Regular season

Acting career
Connors realized that he would not make a career in professional sports, so he decided to pursue an acting career. Playing baseball near Hollywood proved fortunate, as he was spotted by an MGM casting director and subsequently signed for the 1952 Tracy–Hepburn film Pat and Mike, performing the role of a police captain. In 1953, he starred opposite Burt Lancaster as a rebellious Marine private in South Sea Woman and then as an American football coach opposite John Wayne in Trouble Along the Way.

Television roles
Connors had a rare comedic role in a 1955 episode ("Flight to the North") of Adventures of Superman. He portrayed Sylvester J. Superman, a lanky rustic yokel who shared the same name as the title character of the series.

Connors was cast as Lou Brissie, a former professional baseball player wounded during World War II, in the 1956 episode "The Comeback" of the religion anthology series Crossroads. Don DeFore portrayed the Reverend C. E. "Stoney" Jackson, who offered the spiritual insight to assist Brissie's recovery so that he could return to the game. Grant Withers was cast as Coach Whitey Martin; Crossroads regular Robert Carson also played a coach in this episode. Edd Byrnes, Rhys Williams, and Robert Fuller played former soldiers. X Brands is cast as a baseball player.

In 1957, Connors was cast in the Walt Disney film Old Yeller in the role of Burn Sanderson. That same year, he co-starred in The Hired Gun.

Character actor

Connors acted in feature films including The Big Country with Gregory Peck and Charlton Heston, Move Over Darling with Doris Day and James Garner, Soylent Green with Heston and Edward G. Robinson, and Airplane II: The Sequel.

He also became a beloved television character actor, guest-starring in dozens of shows. His guest-starring debut was on an episode of NBC's Dear Phoebe. He played in two episodes, one as the bandit Sam Bass, on Dale Robertson's NBC western Tales of Wells Fargo.

Other television appearances were on Hey, Jeannie!, The Loretta Young Show, Schlitz Playhouse, Screen Directors Playhouse, Four Star Playhouse, Matinee Theatre, Cavalcade of America, Gunsmoke, The Gale Storm Show, The West Point Story, The Millionaire, General Electric Theater hosted by Ronald Reagan, Wagon Train, The Restless Gun with John Payne, Murder, She Wrote, Date with the Angels with Betty White, The DuPont Show with June Allyson, The Virginian, Night Gallery hosted by Rod Serling, and Here's Lucy with Lucille Ball.

The Rifleman

Connors beat 40 other actors for the lead in The Rifleman, portraying Lucas McCain, a widowed rancher known for his skill with a customized Winchester rifle. This ABC Western series, which aired from 1958 to 1963, was also the first show to feature a widowed father raising a young child. Connors said in a 1959 interview with TV Guide that the producers of Four Star Television (Dick Powell, Charles Boyer, Ida Lupino, and David Niven) must have been looking at 40–50 thirty-something men. At the time, the producers offered a certain amount of money to do 40 episodes for the 1958–59 season. The offer turned out to be less than Connors was making doing freelance acting, so he turned it down. A few days later, the producers of The Rifleman took their own children to watch Old Yeller, in which Connors played a strong father figure. After the producers watched him in the movie, they decided they should cast Connors in the role of Lucas McCain and make him a better offer, including a five-percent ownership of the show.

The Rifleman was an immediate hit, ranking No. 4 in the Nielsen ratings in 1958–59, behind three other Westerns – Gunsmoke, Wagon Train, and Have Gun – Will Travel. Johnny Crawford, an unfamiliar actor at the time, former Mousketeer, baseball fan and Western buff, beat 40 other young stars to play the role of Lucas's son, Mark. Crawford remained on the series from 1958 until its cancellation in 1963. The Rifleman landed high in the Nielsen ratings until the last season in 1962–63, when it was opposite the highly rated return to television of Lucille Ball on The Lucy Show and ratings began to drop. The show was cancelled in 1963 after five seasons and 168 episodes.

The rifle

Three rifles were made for the show: two identical 44–40 Winchester model 1892 rifles, one that was used on the show and one for backup, and a Spanish version called an El Tigre used in the saddle holster. The rifle levers were modified from the round type to more "D" shaped in later episodes.

Two rifles were made for Chuck Connors personally by Maurice "Moe" Hunt that were never used on the show. He was a fan of the show and gave them to Connors. Arnold Palmer, a friend and honorary chairman of the annual Chuck Connors charity golf event, was given one of the personal rifles by Connors and it was on display at The World Golf Hall of Fame.

Typecasting and other TV roles 

In 1963, Connors appeared in the film Flipper. He also appeared opposite James Garner and Doris Day in the comedy Move Over, Darling in the role earlier played by Randolph Scott in the original 1940 Irene Dunne/Cary Grant version entitled My Favorite Wife.

As Connors was strongly typecast for playing the single-father rancher, he then starred in several short-lived series, including: ABC's Arrest and Trial (1963–1964), an early forerunner of Law and Order featuring two young actors Ben Gazzara and Don Galloway; and NBC's post-Civil War-era series Branded (1965–1966).

In 1967–1968, Connors starred in the ABC series Cowboy in Africa alongside Tom Nardini and British actor Ronald Howard.

Connors guest-starred in a last-season episode of Night Gallery titled "The Ring With the Red Velvet Ropes". In 1973 and 1974, he hosted a television series called Thrill Seekers.

Connors was nominated for an Emmy Award for his performance in a key role against type: a slave owner in the 1977 miniseries Roots.

Connors hosted a number of episodes of Family Theater on the Mutual Radio Network. This series was aimed at promoting prayer as a path to world peace and stronger families, with the motto, "The family which prays together stays together."

In 1983, Connors joined Sam Elliott, Cybill Shepherd, Ken Curtis, and Noah Beery Jr. in the short-lived NBC series The Yellow Rose, about a modern Texas ranching family.

In 1985, he first guest-starred in the pilot episode which would become a recurring role of "King Powers" in the ABC TV series Spenser: For Hire, starring Robert Urich as “Spenser” — “with an S, like the poet” — and Avery Brooks as “Hawk.”

In 1987, he co-starred in the Fox series Werewolf, as drifter Janos Skorzeny.

In 1988, he guest-starred as "Gideon" in the TV series Paradise, starring Lee Horsley.

In 1991, Connors was inducted into the Western Performers Hall of Fame at the National Cowboy & Western Heritage Museum in Oklahoma City.

Personal life 

Connors was married three times. He met his first wife, Elizabeth Jane Riddell Connors, at one of his baseball games, and married her on October 1, 1948. They had four sons: Michael (1950–2017), Jeffrey (1952–2014), Stephen (born 1953), and Kevin (1956–2005), and divorced in 1961.

Connors married Kamala Devi (1963) the year after co-starring with her in Geronimo. She also acted with Connors in Branded, Broken Sabre, and Cowboy in Africa. They were divorced in 1973.

Connors met his third wife, Faith Quabius, when they both appeared in the film Soylent Green (1973). They were married in 1977 and divorced in 1979.

Connors was a supporter of the Republican Party and attended several fundraisers for campaigns for U.S. President Richard M. Nixon. Connors also backed Barry Goldwater in the 1964 United States presidential election, and Gerald Ford in the 1976 presidential election. He campaigned for Ronald Reagan, a personal friend, and marched in support of the Vietnam War in 1967.

Leonid Brezhnev, the leader of the Soviet Union, met Connors when Brezhnev arrived on Air Force One at El Toro Marine Corps Air Station with President Richard Nixon in June 1973. Brezhnev noticed Connors in the group on the tarmac waiting to receive him and the President. Brezhnev shook Connors' hand and then wrapped his arms around him, lifting the much taller Connors completely off his feet by at least a foot. The crowd laughed and clapped with approval. Later, at a party given by Nixon at the Western White House in San Clemente, California, Connors presented Brezhnev with a pair of Colt Single Action Army "Six-Shooters" (revolvers) which Brezhnev liked greatly.

Few American television programs were permitted to be broadcast in the Soviet Union at that time: The Rifleman  was an exception, because it happened to be Brezhnev's favorite show. Connors and Brezhnev got along so well that Connors accepted an invitation to visit the Soviet leader in Moscow in December 1973. After Brezhnev's death in 1982, Connors expressed an interest in returning to the Soviet Union for the General Secretary's funeral, but the U.S. government would not allow Connors to be part of the official delegation.

Connors was left handed.

On July 18, 1984, Connors was awarded a star on the Hollywood Walk of Fame (star location at 6838 Hollywood Blvd.) Over 200 close friends attended, including his family, and actor Johnny Crawford.

Charity 

Connors hosted the annual Chuck Connors Charitable Invitational Golf Tournament, through the Chuck Connors Charitable Foundation, at the Canyon Country Club in Palm Springs, California. Proceeds went directly to the Angel View Crippled Children's Foundation and over $400,000 was raised.

Death
Connors died on November 10, 1992, at Cedars-Sinai Medical Center in Los Angeles at the age of 71 of lung cancer. He is buried in the San Fernando Mission Cemetery.

Filmography

Film

Television

References

External links

 
 The Rifleman: Chuck Connors
 
 
 
 Jack Bales, "'The Rifleman' (As a Cub)". WrigleyIvy.com.

 TVparty – Meeting with Brezhnev
 Time magazine – Meeting with Brezhnev
 

1921 births
1992 deaths
20th-century American male actors
Adelphi University alumni
American male film actors
American male television actors
American men's basketball players
American people of Irish descent
American philanthropists
Basketball players from New York City
Boston Celtics players
Brooklyn Dodgers players
Burials at San Fernando Mission Cemetery
California Republicans
Centers (basketball)
Chicago Cubs players
Deaths from lung cancer in California
Deaths from pneumonia in California
Los Angeles Angels (minor league) players
Major League Baseball first basemen
Male actors from New York City
Male Western (genre) film actors
Military personnel from New York City
Mobile Bears players
Montreal Royals players
New York (state) Republicans
Newport Dodgers players
Newport News Dodgers players
Norfolk Tars players
Power forwards (basketball)
Seton Hall Pirates baseball players
Seton Hall Pirates men's basketball players
Sportspeople from Brooklyn
Baseball players from New York City
United States Army personnel of World War II
United States Army soldiers
Western (genre) television actors
Basketball players from Los Angeles
American Roman Catholics